An eagle lectern is a lectern in the shape of an eagle on whose outstretched wings the Bible rests. They are most common in Anglican churches and cathedrals, but their use predates the Reformation, and is also found in Catholic churches.

History 
The tradition of using eagle-shaped lecterns predates the Reformation. Medieval examples survive in a number of English churches, including the church of St Margaret in Kings Lynn and the parish church in Ottery St Mary. The Dunkeld Lectern is another notable Medieval eagle lectern.

Symbolism 
The symbolism of the eagle derived from the belief that the bird was capable of staring into the sun and that Christians similarly were able to gaze unflinchingly at the revelation of the divine word. Alternatively, the eagle was believed to be the bird that flew highest in the sky and was therefore closest to heaven, and symbolised the carrying of the word of God to the four corners of the world.

The eagle is the symbol used to depict John the Apostle, whose writing is said to most clearly witness the light and divinity of Christ. In art, John, as the presumed author of the Gospel of John, is often depicted with an eagle, which symbolises the height to which he rose in the first chapter of his gospel. Traditionally each of the four gospels represent a different aspect of Jesus: the Messiah, the servant, the man, and God; believed to be illustrated in Revelation 4:7. John’s gospel, as the one most occupied with Jesus’s divinity, is represented by the eagle and is as it is believed to be directly addressed to the church, has a special significance in Christian art. The eagle also came to represent the inspiration of the gospels.

References

Christian religious furniture